Sir Theodore Henry Lavington Brinckman, 1st Baronet (17 January 1798 – 9 February 1880) was a British politician and baronet.

Born Theodore Broadhead, he was the son of Theodore Henry Broadhead and his wife Elizabeth Macdougall, daughter of William Gordon Macdougall. In 1842, by Royal Licence, he and his brothers resumed the surname Brinckman, which the family had carried before 1786 and their grandfather had changed.

In 1821 he entered the British House of Commons in a by-election for Yarmouth, the same constituency his father has represented before and was a Member of Parliament until 1826. On 30 September 1831, Brinckman was created a baronet, of Burton or Monk Bretton, in the County of York.

He married firstly Hon. Charlotte Godolphin Osborne, only daughter of the 1st Baron Godolphin on 29 August 1829. She died in 1838, and Brinckman married secondly Annabella Corbet, daughter of John Corbet on 18 February 1841. He had five children by his first wife, a daughter and four sons. They lived at St. Leonard's in Clewer near Windsor in Berkshire. Brinckman died, aged 82 and was succeeded in the baronetcy by his oldest son Theodore.

References

External links

1798 births
1880 deaths
Baronets in the Baronetage of the United Kingdom
Members of the Parliament of the United Kingdom for English constituencies
UK MPs 1820–1826
People from Windsor, Berkshire